A cuticle, or cuticula, is any of a variety of tough but flexible, non-mineral outer coverings of an organism, or parts of an organism, that provide protection, including:

Cuticle (hair), the outermost part of a hair shaft
Cuticle (nail) or eponychium, in human anatomy, the thickened layer of skin surrounding finger- and toenails
Primary enamel cuticle, a covering of the crown of a newly erupted tooth
Arthropod cuticle, the major part of the integument, including most of the exoskeleton, of the Arthropoda
Plant cuticle, or cuticula, a waxy polymeric film covering all aerial plant surfaces
Pileipellis or cuticle, the uppermost protective layer of a fungal fruit body